One in the Chamber is a 2012 American action film directed by William Kaufman, and starring Cuba Gooding Jr., and Dolph Lundgren. Gooding and Kaufman had previously worked together on the 2011 film The Hit List. The film was released on direct-to-DVD in the United States on August 21, 2012.

Plot
After the fall of Communism, criminals from the former USSR flooded into Eastern Europe where they established a crime syndicate in a land where authorities were powerless and the laws were replaced by the crime. Dealers of weapons and drugs have turned Prague into their headquarters where they could make millions of dollars by selling weapons to various gangs.

Ray Carver is an assassin who works for two rival mafia families. After Carver fails to assassinate Demyan Ivanov, one of the crime bosses he frequently works for, he decides to kill the brother of the other crime boss, Mikhail Suverov. Mikhail is angry and wants to kill Ray Carver to avenge his brother's death, so he calls Aleksey "The Wolf" Andreev, a legendary Russian hitman who is rumoured to be fictional. Aleksey is out for Carver, but soon they both realize that they are in the middle of a huge gang war. So they decide to team up and kill every member of the mafia in the Prague's criminal underworld.

Cast

Production
It was filmed in Romania in 25 days from July 7 and August 1, 2011. Billy Murray was confirmed to join the cast on July 4, 2011.

Release

Marketing
The trailer for the film was released on June 27, 2012. The first clip from the film was released on July 23, 2012.

Home media
The DVD was released by Anchor Bay Entertainment in Region 1 on August 21, 2012 and Region 2 on August 27.

Reception

Critical response
The film received mildly positive reviews. Movie Ramblings said "One In The Chamber is a perfectly serviceable thriller – just don’t expect too much." Very Aware said "It’s certainly not the worst thing you’ll ever put in your Blu-ray player, but put it in your Blu-ray player you should." The Other View said "At best, give it a rental before you buy, but I think it’s worth it." We've Got This Covered said "is a good example of how to make a good straight-to-DVD film."

References

External links

2012 films
2012 direct-to-video films
2012 action films
American action films
Films set in Europe
Films set in Romania
Films set in the Czech Republic
Films about organized crime in the United States
Films with screenplays by Derek Kolstad
2010s English-language films
Films directed by William Kaufman
2010s American films